Two ocean liners of the Cunard Line have been named RMS Mauretania, after the ancient territory of Mauretania:

 , launched in 1906 and in service until 1934
 , launched in 1938 and scrapped in 1965

Ship names